Stephen Rex Donald (born 3 December 1983) is a New Zealand rugby union player who currently plays for the NEC Green Rockets in the Japanese Top League. A first five-eighth or centre, he has won 24 international caps for New Zealand. Nicknamed 'Beaver', he is best known for kicking the winning penalty in the 2011 Rugby World Cup Final.

Domestic career

Waikato 
Initially progressing and playing through all levels for the Waikato province in the ITM Cup.

Chiefs 
He then played for the Chiefs in the Super Rugby competition. He would initially play for the franchise from 2005 until 2011.

In 2015, Donald had signed to return to New Zealand to play for Waikato in the ITM Cup. Donald made his return with Waikato on 10 September 2015 against Southland at Waikato Stadium, coming on as a substitute.

In June 2016, Donald captained the Chiefs to a dominating win over Wales. Although the Welsh were the strong favourites going into the match, Donald had played a 'man of the match' role, dominating his opponents whilst also setting up two tries and perfect goal-kicking percentage which saw the Chiefs beat the Welsh 40–7. Donald also received a standing ovation from the crowd after being subbed in the 68th minute. Donald was controversially disallowed a try just before halftime after the TMO could not see any clear grounding of the ball.

In February 2019 it was announced that Donald had joined the Chiefs once again as injury cover for Tiaan Falcon.

Bath Rugby 
Donald signed for English Premiership club Bath Rugby for a -year deal. Initially denied a work permit, Bath appealed the decision against the UK Government and, with the support of the RFU, won their appeal against the refusal. Donald joined Bath after the Rugby World Cup 2011, making his début in the 68th minute of their Heineken Cup clash with Glasgow on 13 November 2011, scoring a penalty with 90 seconds to go.

The Blues denied reports stating that Donald had signed for the team for 2012 as a replacement for Stephen Brett and Luke McAlister, who are both heading overseas.

Mitsubishi Dynaboars 
In April 2013, it was announced Donald would leave Bath Rugby to join Japanese side Mitsubishi Sagamihara DynaBoars in the Top League for the 2013/14 season.

International career 

Despite an international career that had not lived up to expectations, he played for the All Blacks from 2008 till 2011. Donald, aka 'The Beaver', kicked the winning penalty in the 2011 IRB Rugby World Cup Final for New Zealand.

Donald played on an international-level for the All Blacks from 2008 to 2011. Throughout his time playing for the All Blacks, Donald had been the subject of harsh criticism as well as high praise.

One instance of note was in October 2010, when the All Blacks faced off against the Wallabies in a Bledisloe Cup match in Hong Kong. In the 60th minute of the game, Donald came on as a substitute for Dan Carter and the All Blacks held a five-point lead, just after Drew Mitchell scored a converted try. Donald had missed a penalty-kick that would have put the game out of reach. The situation was made worse when Donald failed to kick the ball into touch in the dying minutes of the game. After launching a counter-attack, James O'Connor scored a try in the corner to level the score. O'Connor managed to convert that try to win the game for the Australians and the blame of the loss fell primarily on Donald. Although defended by team personnel, Donald had seemingly fallen out of favour with the public and selectors. After the 2010 season had culminated, the All Black selectors looked toward players such as Colin Slade and Aaron Cruden more favourably. Donald was not named in the initial 2011 Rugby World Cup All Blacks squad and with his forthcoming move to Bath Rugby, it seemed to be the end of his All Black career.

However, a string of injures hit the All Blacks that would see Donald return to the squad. During training the day before the All Blacks match against Canada, Dan Carter sustained a tournament-ending groin injury and was subsequently replaced by Aaron Cruden. On 9 October, Colin Slade sustained a groin tear which led to Donald receiving a call-up as replacement first-five for the All Blacks heading into the finals. A cartoon by Tom Scott in the lead-up to the 2011 Rugby World Cup Final described it as a "nightmare" if New Zealand's fate was left in his hands. Donald was not used in the semi-final against Australia, however he would be used in the final against France. Cruden sustained a knee injury 34 minutes into the first half, which left Donald to take to the field. After receiving a penalty in the 46th minute, Donald converted a penalty-kick which extended their lead to eight points. Shortly afterwards, France regained the ball from the kick-off and Thierry Dusautoir scored under the posts, bringing the score to 8–7. Despite the resilient and strong performance from the French, this would be their only set of points scored in the final. Coupled with Tony Woodcock's try, Donald's penalty-kick was ultimately what won the New Zealand side their second Rugby World Cup. After the final, Donald was hailed as the player that won the World Cup for New Zealand and had become somewhat of a national hero thereafter.

In honour of his contribution to winning the World Cup, his local rugby club in Waiuku has renamed their home ground to Beaver Park.

A biopic on Donald's journey to the World Cup final entitled "The Kick" screened on TVNZ on 10 August 2014.

Stephen appeared on the second episode of The Masked Singer NZ as "Moa", being unmasked in his first appearance.

Statistics 
Test record overall:

Television 
Donald is due to appear along side with Israel Dagg in the New Zealand 2023 television series, Clubhouse Rescue.

Honours

Waikato 
 NPC/Air New Zealand Cup Champion, 2006
 Ranfurly Shield holder

Chiefs
 Super Rugby Runners up: 2009

Bath
 European Challenge Cup Runners Up: 2013-2014

New Zealand 
Rugby World Cup Winner: 2011
Tri Nations Winner: 2008
Bledisloe Cup Winner (3): 2008-2010

References

External links 
 
 Stephen Donald Chiefs' profile

1983 births
Living people
Bath Rugby players
Chiefs (rugby union) players
Counties Manukau rugby union players
Expatriate rugby union players in England
Expatriate rugby union players in Japan
Mitsubishi Sagamihara DynaBoars players
New Zealand expatriate rugby union players
New Zealand expatriate sportspeople in Japan
New Zealand expatriate sportspeople in England
New Zealand international rugby union players
New Zealand rugby union players
People educated at Wesley College, Auckland
People from Papakura
Rugby union fly-halves
Tokyo Sungoliath players
University of Auckland alumni
University of Waikato alumni
Waikato rugby union players
Rugby union players from Auckland